John Harris (c. 1690 - 5 October 1767) was a British courtier and politician who sat in the House of Commons for forty years from 1727 to 1767.

He was a Member of Parliament for Helston from 1727 and then sat for Ashburton from 1741 to 1767. From 1741 he also held the post of Master of the Household to George II and III.

Harris was the second son of William Harris. His elder brother, Christopher Harris, was MP for Okehampton.

References

1767 deaths
Year of birth uncertain
Members of the Parliament of Great Britain for constituencies in Cornwall
Members of the Parliament of Great Britain for Ashburton
British MPs 1727–1734
British MPs 1734–1741
British MPs 1741–1747
British MPs 1747–1754
British MPs 1754–1761
British MPs 1761–1768
Masters of the Household
1690s births
Members of the British Royal Household